Misamis University (also referred to as MU)  is a privately owned, non-sectarian, non-profit educational institution founded by Dr. Hilarion Feliciano and Doña Maria Mercado Feliciano in 1929. Misamis University is currently the only autonomous university granted an ISO 9001:2015 Management System Certified granted by Det Norske Veritas-Germanischer Lloyd Business Assurance by the Commission on Higher Education (CHED) in Northwestern Mindanao, and awarded by te Philippine Association of Colleges and Universities Commission on Accreditation as the Most Number of Accredited Programs in Region X.

Misamis University caters to more than 8,000 students every year in its 7.5 hectare campus in Ozamiz City and Oroquieta City, Misamis Occidental Philippines.

The University has achieved Deregulated Status from CHED which means it is free from the agency's monitoring, has access to grants and financial incentives and decide the development of their curriculum. CHED also recognizes Misamis University as a Center of Development for Criminology and for Information Technology.

References

External links
 Official Website

 
Schools in Misamis Occidental
Educational institutions established in 1929
Universities and colleges in Misamis Occidental
Education in Ozamiz
Private universities and colleges in the Philippines
Misamis Occidental
1929 establishments in the Philippines
Education in Misamis Occidental
Buildings and structures in Misamis Occidental